Kemal Meredow (born 2 February 1994) is a Turkmen male ju-jitsu practitioner. He represented Turkmenistan at the 2018 Asian Games and claimed a bronze medal in the men's ne-waza 56kg event.

References 

1994 births
Living people
Turkmenistan male martial artists
Ju-jitsu practitioners at the 2018 Asian Games
Medalists at the 2018 Asian Games
Asian Games bronze medalists for Turkmenistan
Asian Games medalists in ju-jitsu